Centennial is a neighborhood on the eastern edge of the Southeast section of Portland, Oregon, on the border with Gresham.
The neighborhood includes Lynchwood Park (1993) and Parklane Park (1993).

The unrelated Centennial, Oregon post office near Delta Park in North Portland served the Oregon statehood Centennial Exposition from June to September 1959.

Prior being annexed by Portland, the community was enumerated as a "Census-designated place" in 1980, when the community recorded a population of 22,118. The community was also part of the CDP of Powellhurst-Centennial in 1990, which the census area recorded a population of 28,756.

References

External links
 Guide to Centennial Neighborhood (PortlandNeighborhood.com)
 Centennial Street Tree Inventory Report

Neighborhoods in Portland, Oregon
Former census-designated places in Oregon